The Death of Feminism: What's Next in the Struggle for Women's Freedom is a 2005 non-fiction book by Phyllis Chesler. In it, she criticizes the contemporary feminist community for not sufficiently opposing Islamism.

Chesler stated that she chose her title since the movement became characterized by "a moral failure, a moral bankruptcy, a refusal to take on, in particular, Muslim gender apartheid".

A portion of the book describes a period in her life where she was held against her will by her husband's family in Afghanistan. She urges feminists to reconsider any pro-Islamist positions in the book's end chapter.

Reception
Kirkus Reviews stated that it is "a fierce polemic, filled with vigorous arguments and distressing human stories."

Publishers Weekly stated that "Chesler raises important issues, but her style will alienate the very people she means to reach."

References

External links
 Death of Feminism - Phyllis Chesler official website

2005 non-fiction books
American non-fiction books
Books by Phyllis Chesler